Elefant Records is an independent record label based in Madrid, Spain.

History
Elefant Records was founded in 1989 by Luis Calvo as an offshoot of a fanzine he produced called "La Línea del Arco". In 2014, the label's 25th anniversary was celebrated with the launch of its entire catalog on the Bandcamp platform.

Notable artists

See also 
 List of record labels

References 

Spanish independent record labels
Record labels established in 1989
IFPI members